Callaloo may refer to:

In cuisine:

 Callaloo, a Caribbean dish sometimes called pepperpot, made with the leaves of a plant also called "callaloo"
 Amaranthus, a genus of herb used to make the dish
 Malanga, or Xanthosoma, a plant used to make the dish
 Taro, a plant used to make the dish
 "Kalalou" is Haitian Kreyol for Okra 

In academia:

 Callaloo (journal), an academic journal